Christopher Michael Pryor (born January 23, 1961) is an American former professional ice hockey defenseman who played parts of six seasons in the National Hockey League (NHL) for the Minnesota North Stars and New York Islanders. He currently serves as the Assistant General Manager of the Pittsburgh Penguins in the NHL.

At the conclusion of his playing career in 1993, Pryor was an assistant coach for one season with the minor league Salt Lake Golden Eagles, before he transitioned into a front office career as a scout. He was an amateur scout and player development director for the New York Islanders from 1994 to 1998. 

From 1998 until his termination in 2019, he was a part of the Philadelphia Flyers organization, filling the roles of scout, scouting director, director of player personnel and eventually Assistant General Manager.

After two years with the Nashville Predators scouting department, he was hired by incoming Pittsburgh Penguins General Manager Ron Hextall in February, 2021 to join the Penguins as director of player personnel. His role involved overseeing the organization's scouting operations in North America and Europe as well as assisting in team personnel decisions. His hiring was regarded as a "No.1 Priority" for Hextall, as the pair had previously worked together extensively in Philadelphia. Pryor was promoted on June 14, 2022 to Assistant General Manager, aiding Hextall in managing all aspects of the team.

Career statistics

References

External links
 

1961 births
American men's ice hockey defensemen
Capital District Islanders players
Ice hockey people from Minnesota
Kalamazoo Wings (1974–2000) players
Living people
Minnesota North Stars players
New Hampshire Wildcats men's ice hockey players
New York Islanders players
New York Islanders scouts
Philadelphia Flyers executives
Philadelphia Flyers scouts
Ice hockey player-coaches
Salt Lake Golden Eagles (CHL) players
Sportspeople from Saint Paul, Minnesota
Springfield Indians players
Undrafted National Hockey League players
Ice hockey people from Saint Paul, Minnesota